Suad Joseph (born 6 September 1943) received her doctorate in Anthropology from Columbia University in 1975. Dr. Joseph is Professor of Anthropology and Women and Gender Studies at the University of California, Davis and in 2009 was President of the Middle East Studies Association of North America. Her research addresses issues of gender; families, children, and youth; sociology of the family; and selfhood, citizenship, and the state in the Middle East, with a focus on her native Lebanon. Her earlier work focused on the politicization of religion in Lebanon. Joseph is the founder of the Middle East Research Group in Anthropology (now the Middle East Section of the American Anthropological Association), the founder and coordinator of the Arab Families Working Group, the founder of the Association for Middle East Women's Studies, the general editor of the Encyclopedia of Women and Islamic Cultures, and the founding director of the Middle East/South Asian Studies Program at the University of California at Davis. She is also the founder and facilitator of a six-university consortium of the American University of Beirut, American University in Cairo, Lebanese American University, University of California at Davis, and Birzeit University Consortium.

Early life
Joseph was born in Lebanon as the youngest of seven children. Joseph and four brothers and two sisters were taught to put schooling first by their parents who were unskilled laborers. Her mother, Rose Haddad Joseph, was illiterate. Joseph grew up in Cortland, New York, and thanks to the local State University of New York, Cortland, she was able to achieve an undergraduate education. She then went on to complete graduate school, studying anthropology at the University of Pittsburgh and then at Columbia University, where she achieved her doctoral degree in anthropology. She and all six of her siblings went on to achieve advanced degrees.

Arab Families Working Group
Joseph founded the Arab Families Working Group (AFWG) in 2001. The organization is an international collective of sixteen scholars whose work focuses on families and youth in Palestine, Lebanon and Egypt and their diasporas. AFWG, in addition to its research, undertakes capacity building to help prepare a new generation of scholars in Palestine, Lebanon, and Egypt; works with NGO's and stakeholders to exchange research findings; and works to transform their research into policy briefs and papers for NGO's and policy makers working with Arab families and youth. They also are committed to translating their relevant works into Arabic to make their findings of use to the local public.

Encyclopedia of Women and Islamic Cultures
Joseph founded the Encyclopedia of Women and Islamic Cultures (EWIC) project and is its general editor. EWIC is a six-volume interdisciplinary, transhistorical encyclopaedia, published between 2002 and 2007, that examines the experiences of Muslim women globally as well as non-Muslim women in Islamic societies.

American Anthropological Association, ME Section
Joseph is the founder of the Middle East Research Group in Anthropology, which later evolved into the Middle East Section (MES) of the American Anthropological Association. MES brings together anthropologists with an interest in the peoples, cultures, and histories of the Middle East. Its membership is international, composed of anthropologists from diverse subdisciplines including sociocultural anthropology, medical anthropology, and archeology. As such, according to the website, MES is “uniquely poised to contribute to establishing and promoting public understanding and policy frameworks that accommodate the historical experience and sociocultural diversity of the peoples of the Middle East.” MES scholars convene annually at the conference of the American Anthropological Association.

Association for Middle East Women's Studies
Joseph is the founder of the Association for Middle East Women's Studies (AMEWS) and co-founder of the Journal of Middle East Women's Studies. AMEWS is an organization of scholars and individuals with an interest in women and gender studies in the context of the Middle East, North Africa, including their diasporic communities. AMEWS works to organize and sponsor conferences, workshops and symposia that encourage research and collaboration in these areas. AMEWS is affiliated with the Middle East Studies Association of North America. It produces the Journal of Middle East Women's Studies (JMEWS), which is published triennially by Indiana University Press. According to their website, JMEWS is "a venue for region-specific research informed by transnational feminist, gender, and sexuality scholarship," and encourages editors to submit work "that employs historical, ethnographic, literary, textual, and visual analyses and methodologies."

Middle East/South Asia Studies Program, UC Davis
Joseph is the Founding Director of the Middle East/South Asia Studies Program (ME/SA) at the University of California, Davis (2004–2009). ME/SA meets the growing demand of students for courses to develop their understanding of this critical region. Originally launched as an undergraduate minor program, ME/SA won a substantial grant from the U.S. Department of Education in 2006 enabling it to add new courses including Arabic and Hindi/Urdu instruction, sponsor conferences and lectures, and launch a K-12 teacher training workshop. In the Fall of 2008, ME/SA launched its undergraduate Major, and by 2010, it had 30 affiliated faculty members, 20 teaching faculty members, and offered over 80 courses. By 2011, ME/SA had won an endowment for a Visiting Lecturer from the PARSA Community Foundation to launch Iranian studies. ME/SA will offer a minor in Iranian Studies by 2014. In 2011 ME/SA also won a donor gift to assist in the development of an Arab Studies minor which it also plans to launch by 2014. Joseph led both of these efforts. According to the website, “As the only University of California campus with a minor and major in Middle East/South Asia Studies, UC Davis is a pioneer in the study of the Middle East and South Asia in relationship to each other.”

Five-university consortium facilitator
Joseph is the facilitator of the American University of Beirut, American University in Cairo, Lebanese American University, University of California, Davis and Birzeit University Consortium, which she founded in 2011. The five-university consortium organizes collaborative research among the scholars at these universities. Collaborations have included projects on water, law, gender, genetics, biotechnology, the environment, Middle East studies and other interdisciplinary research.

Honors and awards
1976-78   Founding President, Middle East Research Group in Anthropology
1985-87   Founding President, Association for Middle East Women's Studies 
1994   Distinguished Alumnus Award. Cortland College Alumni Association. State University of New York, Cortland
1997   Pro Femina Research Consortium, Outstanding Mentor Award
2003   Lyceum Distinguished Scholar Award. Wichita State University
2003   Sabbagh Distinguished Lecturer. University of Arizona
2004	Distinguished Scholarly Public Service Award, University of California, Davis 
2004   Founding Director, Middle East/South Asian Studies Program 
2009-12   Named Endowed Lecture Series: Suad Joseph Iranian Studies Lecture Series, University of California, Davis
2010   Journal of Middle East Women's Studies Distinguished Lecturer, UCLA
2010-2011   President, Middle East Studies Association of North America
2012    Chancellor's Achievement Award for Diversity and Community by the University of California, Davis. 
2011-13 President, Arab American Studies Association
2014  UC Davis Prize (excellence in teaching award)

Selected publications

Encyclopedia
Joseph, Suad, General Ed. 2003-2007. Encyclopedia of Women and Islamic Cultures. 6 vols. Leiden: Brill. 
−−−, General Ed. 2010. Encyclopedia of Women and Islamic Cultures EWIC Online. Supplement I. Leiden: Brill.

Edited and co-edited books
Joseph, Suad and Barbara L.K. Pillsbury, eds. 1978. Muslim-Christian Conflicts: Economic, Political and Social Origins. Boulder, CO.: Westview Press.
Moubarak, Walid, Antoine Messarra, and Suad Joseph, eds. 1999.	Building Citizenship in Lebanon. Beirut: Lebanese American University Press. (In Arabic).
Joseph, Suad, ed. 1999. Intimate Selving in Arab Families: Gender, Self and Identity. Syracuse: Syracuse University Press.
Hamadeh, Najla, Jean Said Makdisi, and Suad Joseph, eds. 1999. Gender and Citizenship in Lebanon. Beirut: Dar al Jadid Press. (In Arabic).
Joseph, Suad, ed. 2000. Gender and Citizenship in the Middle East. Syracuse: Syracuse University Press.
Joseph, Suad and Susan Slyomovics. 2001. Women and Power in the Middle East. Philadelphia: University of Pennsylvania Press.

Book chapters

Journal articles

References

External links

Living people
University of California, Davis faculty
Columbia Graduate School of Arts and Sciences alumni
American people of Lebanese descent
American women anthropologists
American women political scientists
American political scientists
American anthropologists
Lebanese anthropologists
Social anthropologists
Cultural anthropologists
Feminist studies scholars
International relations scholars
1943 births
University of Pittsburgh alumni
State University of New York at Cortland alumni
Lebanese feminists
Lebanese women activists
21st-century American women